The Advanced Concepts Team is a group of scientists, researchers and young graduates that perform multidisciplinary research within the European Space Agency. Located at the European Space Research and Technology Centre, in the Netherlands, the team was instituted in 2002 with the objective of fostering advanced research on space systems, innovative concepts and working methods. It serves the function of a think tank providing decision makers the support of a highly multidisciplinary research group. Science and engineering research fellows (PhDs working at the European Space Agency for 2 years), Young Graduate Trainee and interns form the bulk of the Team. They carry out research work on advanced topics and emerging technologies and perform highly skilled analysis on a wide range of topics.



Introduction

The Advanced Concepts Team (ACT) is a multidisciplinary research group at the European Space Agency. Its task is to facilitate disruptive changes in space technology by performing solid research on "exotic" topics typically not considered by "mainstream" space science.

General research areas include:
 Artificial intelligence, Mission Analysis, Planetary System Science, Fundamental physics, Biomimetics, Mathematics and informatics, Plasma Physics, Space Propulsion, Space economy and architecture.

Research
One of the founding philosophies of the team is, from its very beginning, that of open science. The research papers and reports produced are made available, whenever possible. The team maintains its own on-line journal called ActaFutura  and promotes and drives several open source initiatives among which PyGMO, PaGMO, PyKEP, "AuDi" and "dCGP".

Some highlights
 (2003) The ACT initiates (in the framework of ESA's General Studies Programme) a number of ESA's asteroid mission studies related to impact risk assessment. The outcome is a phase A study on an asteroid deflection mission named Don Quijote.
 (2003) The ACT starts the first phase of the European Solar Power Satellite assessment. Trade offs between placing solar plants in orbit and in the ground are performed.
 (2004) The ACT introduces for the first time in ESA a systematic research of inspiration from biological solutions to approach space problems.
 (2004) The ACT starts the development of a distributed computing environment general for ESA computations. See https://web.archive.org/web/20070908022007/http://www.esa.int/gsp/ACT/inf/pp/act-dc.htm
 (2005) The ACT demonstrate that asteroid deflection is technologically possible in some cases and shows how to deflect the asteroid Apophis 99942 with a small kinetic impactor mission.
 (2005) The ACT finds numerical evidence that formation flying missions can benefit from two previously unknown special inclinations (49 degrees and 131) where the control effort is minimal due to a perfect match between the in-plane and the off-plane frequencies.
 (2005) The ACT initiates and organizes GTOC: an international competition on Global Trajectory Optimisation. The competition is conceived in the form of a kind of America's cup with the winner organizing the following edition.
 (2005) The ACT studies the DS4G propulsion concept allowing its ESTEC test that established the world record in achieved specific impulse. The ACT consequently proves that a mission to 200AU is possible in 22 years using the DS4G preliminary performance evaluation.
 (2006) The ACT starts to test Web 2.0 technologies as working methods in the European Space Agency. Wikis, subversions and other concurrent working environment are tried and developed.
 (2006) The ACT coordinates a European research effort to determine for the first time the effects of microgravity on the emerging techniques for interfacing, noninvasively, the human brain with a machine.
 (2007) US researchers confirm the ACT numerical findings on the magic inclinations.
 (2007) Researchers from the ACT test for the first time a brain machine interface in micro-gravity.
 (2008) The ACT make available on-line the first semantic database containing trajectories to Near Earth Objects.
 (2009) A first attempt to detect human curiosity from brain waves is done by the ACT in cooperation with EPFL and DCU.
 (2009) Elementary Motion Detectors inspired by the biological functioning principles of insect eyes are successfully used during a lunar landing simulation.
 (2009) The island model for parallel computations is made available and extended to non evolutionary algorithm in the open source software suite PaGMO.
 (2010) Participation in Google's initiative Summer of Code with its PaGMO open source platform. First time a space Agency opens up to open source development via such consolidated tools.
 (2010) The Space Game, an html5 web game developed by ACT researchers (also featured in Chromium experiments), is the most visited event of the 2010 World Space Week.
 (2011) Esa Summer of Code pilot project  is invented, organized and successfully run by the team, proving the value of open source initiatives and tools for software development related to space.
 (2011) Evolutionary Robotics first time use in a space related application. The ACT successfully trained an artificial neural network to steer attitude and positions of the three MIT SPHERES on board the ISS.
 (2011) PyGMO V.1.0.0 is released. The ACT developed 'generalized island model', a coarse grained massively parallelization approach to global optimization, is available cross-platform to solve, in a massively parallel fashion, complex global optimization problems.
 (2012) A spacecraft landing is successfully carried out (in simulation) using only vision (without altimeter or any other exteroceptive clues), consuming 10% more mass than what would be optimal. This paves the way to a number of innovative ideas for micro vehicles and for backup landing system in larger spacecraft.
 (2012) 10th anniversary - ten years Advanced Concepts Team 
 (2012) The team solves for the first time  in an explicit analytical form the Post Newtonian two-spinning-body problem in the general relativity frame. The result is possible thanks to a careful use of Lie perturbation theory and Weierstrass elliptic P function.
 (2015) An ISS experiment  proves for the first time robotic learning in zero-g (http://www.esa.int/Our_Activities/Space_Engineering_Technology/One-eyed_robot_learns_to_see_in_weightlessness)
 (2015) The team wins the eight edition of the GTOC organized by JPL.
 (2015) A deep neural network architecture is successfully used, for the first time successfully, to optimally control simulated spacecraft and rocket descents.
 (2016) The Kelvins competition platform is released. Machine learning and data mining communities are brought closer to ESA activities and space in general.  The first Machine Learning competition organized by the ACT, called Mars Express Power Challenge, reveals to be a great success.
 (2016) The ACT produces a black hole visualisation interactive website.

People
The following scientists have worked at the Advanced Concepts Team and are now affiliated with a different institution:

Martin Nisser, Joerg Mueller, Clemens Rumpf, Jose Alberto Santos De La Serna, Viktor Wase, Nina Nadine Ridder, Thijs Versloot, Elvire Flocken-Vitez, Alejandro Gonzalez Puerta, Jessica Gemignani, Tom Gheysens, Daniel Hennes, Krzysztof Nowak, Ingmar Getzner, Pierre Mascarade, Anna Heffernan, Marko Jankovic, Rita Neves, Siem van Limpt, Christopher Gerekos, Christophe Praz, Isabelle Dicaire, Aleke Nolte, Athanasia Nikolaou, Paul Neculoiu, Annalisa Riccardi, Georgios Methenitis, Francisco Fernandez-Navarro, Carlos Ortega Absil, Stefan Willi, Beniamino Abis, Johannes Simon, Robert Musters, Aurelie Heritier, Jacco Geul, Maria Angeles de la Cruz, Sante Carloni, Wiktor Piotrowski, Hermanni Heimonen, Waldemar Franczak, Matthias Gerstgrasser, Marcus Maertens, Christos Vezyris, Markus Schoelmerich, Camilla Pandolfi, Dejan Petkow, Guido de Croon, Luke O'Connor, Maryia Zaretskaya, Helia Sharif, Alexander Kling, Vincent Casseau, Paul Gerke, Lionel Jacques, Duncan Barker, Marion Nachon, Joey Latta, Terence Pei Fu, Giuseppina Schiavone, Luis Felismino Simoes, Loretta Latronico, Cynthia Maan, Francesco Biscani, Eduardo Martin Moraud, Sreeja Nag, Neus, Pacome Delva, Lukas Schimmer, Juxi Leitner, Friederike Sontag, Nina Ridder, Christos Ampatzis, David di Lorenzo, Nikolas Smyrlakis, Nicholas Weiss, Tobias Seidl, Marek Rucinski, Kevin de Groote, Oisin Purcell, David Swords, Jussi Mäkitalo, Jose llorens Montolio, Luzi Bergamin, Maria de Juan Ovelar, Amélie Barth, Aurélien Hees, Marco del rey Zapatero, Maria Johansson, Luca Rossini, Francois Nuyttens, Laura Torres Soto, Naomi Murdoch, Tamas Vinko, Claudio Bombardelli, Cristina Bramanti, Daniela Girimonte, Nick Lincoln, Nicolo Alberti, Zoe Szajnfarber, Martin Fuchs, Simone Centuori, Tallha Samaree, Stefan Brendelberger, Meilanne Lancion, Daniela Girimonte, Michael Broschart, Carlo Menon, Luca Rossini, Lise Bilhaut, Nicholas Lan, Cristina de Negueruela, Andrés Gálvez, Tom Reunes, Fabio Pinna, Roger Walker, Mihaly Csaba Markot, Sarah Hardacre, Tiziana Pipoli, Andreas Rathke, Denis Defrere, Arnaud Bourdoux, Isabelle Nann, Mark Ayre, Lorenzo Pettazzi, John McCann, Torsten Bondo, Tiago Pardal, Massimiliano Vasile, Grégory Saive, Natacha Linder, Chiara Silvestri, Paolo de Pascale, Stefano Campagnola, Chit Hong Yam

See also
NASA Institute for Advanced Concepts
Concurrent Design Facility

References

External links
 Advanced Concepts Team - home page
 Advanced Concepts Team - publications

European Space Agency